The Women competition at the 2019 World Aquatics Championships was held on 22 and 23 July 2019.

Results
The first two rounds were held on 22 July at 11:30. The last two round were started on 23 July at 12:00.

References

Women